The Dean of Wolverhampton was the head of the chapter of Canons at St. Peter's Collegiate Church, Wolverhampton until the chapter was disestablished in 1846. The collegiate church was, until that point, a Royal Peculiar falling outside of the diocesan and provincial structures of the Church of England. Today, the church is district church within a team parish led by a rector, although it has its own vicar and curate within the team. It is now part of the Diocese of Lichfield.

List of deans
The deanery was probably established in the mid-12th century, along the lines adopted at Lichfield Cathedral, as the church was in episcopal hands at that time. The names of earlier heads of the chapter and any deans before Peter of Blois have not survived. Samson, William the Conqueror's chaplain was feudal overlord of the canons, but there is no evidence he headed the chapter and he was not ordained priest until he became bishop of Worcester. The following were deans of Wolverhampton before the post became assimilated to the deanery of Windsor, around 1480.

High Medieval
bef. 1190 Peter of Blois
1203 Nicholas
1203 Deanery suspended
1205 Henry Fitz Geoffrey
By 1224 Giles of Erdington
1269 Theodosius de Camilla
1295 Philip of Everdon

Late Medieval
1303 John of Everdon
 1318  Walter de Islip
1322 Godfrey of Rudham
1326 Robert of Silkstone
1328 John of Melbourne
1328 John of the Chamber
1328 Hugh Ellis

1339 Philip Weston
1368 John of Newnham
1369 Amaury Shirland
1373 Richard Postell
1394 Lawrence Allerthorpe
1406 Thomas Stanley
1410 Robert Wolveden
1426 William Felter
1437 John Barningham
1457 William Dudley
1477 Lionel Woodville

Modern era
1479 onwards Deanery united to that of Windsor
1646–1660 Deanery suspended
1846 Deanery abolished (on the death of Henry Hobart)

References